Davis Campus Co-ops (DCC) is a nonprofit organization whose mission is to provide low-cost cooperative housing for students attending University of California, Davis. Today, DCC owns one student housing cooperative called Pacifico Student Cooperative Housing, located in South Davis. In 2006, DCC partnered with the North American Students of Cooperation and the City of Davis to provide stronger cooperative education and management support. Governance of DCC is now coterminous with the NASCO Properties Board of Directors.

History
Incorporated in 1982, DCC opened its first student co-ops on campus at Parkway Circle in 1988. Pioneer Co-op and Kagawa Co-op continue to operate in the same location today under a private management company.

In 1988, (the same year the Parkway Circle co-ops opened), a delegation from the Japanese Consumer Cooperatives visited Davis and formed a partnership with DCC that would lead to the development of housing Pacifico Student Cooperative Housing. With a commitment of $400,000 from its Japanese partners, DCC gained the support of ASUCD and the Davis City Council to develop another housing co-op off-campus. Ten years following that first visit by the Japanese, the developers of Allegre Apartments agreed to donate land to DCC for the purpose of establishing a new student housing co-op. Construction began in March 2000, and after a summer of building, the first three of Pacifico's four co-op buildings - Kyoto, Unity & Rochdale - opened their doors. Pacifico's fourth building - Kaweah House - opened its doors in 2003.

In Fall 2005, DCC and the members of Pacifico voted to pursue a management arrangement with NASCO. The former DCC Trustees stepped down and appointed the NASCO Properties Board of Directors as Trustees. NASCO replaces the professional management company, MBS, and gives more democratic control to the co-op residents.

Affiliated Co-ops
 Pacifico Student Cooperative Housing
 Parkway Circle Co-ops

References

University of California, Davis
Residential buildings in California
Student housing cooperatives in the United States